The siege of Gurganj took place during the Mongol conquest of the Khwarazmian Empire. Genghis Khan, ruler of the Mongol Empire, had launched a multi-pronged assault on the Khwarazmian Empire, ruled by Shah Muhammad II. Through a combination of efficient planning and excellent manoeuvering, the Khan's army managed to take the border town of Otrar swiftly, followed by the large cities of Bukhara and Samarkand.

Genghis sent a detachment, led by his sons Jochi and Chagatai, northwest to lay siege to the former capital of Gurganj. Immensely wealthy, the city lay on marshy grounds on the delta of the Amu Darya, making it difficult to assault. The siege was further complicated by disagreements between the two commanding brothers. Eventually, Genghis sent Ogedai, his third son and eventual heir, as sole commander for the siege.

When the city was eventually taken, it was annihilated, in one of the bloodiest massacres in human history.

References

Khwarazmian Empire
1221 in the Mongol Empire
Conflicts in 1221
Mongol invasion of the Khwarazmian Empire